Corps of Gendarmes may refer to:

 Special Corps of Gendarmes of the Russian Empire
 Corps of Gendarmerie of Vatican City